Bandido is a 1956 American Western film starring Robert Mitchum, Ursula Thiess, Gilbert Roland, and Zachary Scott. The film, set in the Mexican Revolution and filmed on location around Acapulco, was written by Earl Felton and directed by Richard Fleischer. Robert Mitchum also co-produced the film through his DRM Productions company.

Plot
In 1916 during the Mexican Revolution, American Wilson checks into a Mexican hotel in the midst of a pitched battle. Equipped with a suitcase full of Mk 2 grenades, he throws a few "samples" at the "Regulares" in the square, enabling revolutionary Col. Escobar to rout his enemies. Escobar's men praise Wilson, calling him "El Alacran" (the scorpion) for the sting of his grenades. Wilson offers to get Escobar's poorly equipped men weapons and ammunition, in exchange for half the loot, but Escobar decides to attack the next town without his help. When Escobar returns, defeated, Wilson explains that an American arms dealer named Kennedy is on his way to sell a large shipment of arms and ammunition to General Lorenzo. Wilson proposes capturing Kennedy and forcing him to turn over his wares to Escobar.

Before Kennedy is captured, he sends an aide to Lorenzo to set a trap. Kennedy says the arms are at his fishing lodge. Escobar decides to send him there with some of his men, but Wilson, who is attracted to Kennedy's discontented wife Lisa, convinces Escobar to send her instead, much to Kennedy's dismay. Escobar orders that she be shot if no arms are found, but Wilson helps her escape and encourages her to flee north to the U.S.

Angered by what he perceives as treachery, Escobar imprisons Wilson along with Kennedy, to await execution. Wilson somehow still has two hand grenades, which he uses to blow their way out. Escobar's men chase them and manage to shoot Kennedy. The rebels have to break off the search, however, when the Regulares advance on the town. Wilson takes Kennedy to a priest, who removes the bullet, and manages to get the actual location of the arms cache. When Lisa arrives with the Regulares, Kennedy becomes jealous and tries to shoot Wilson, only to be killed by Escobar, who had snuck back to ensure that his enemies do not get the weapons.

Wilson and Escobar race to the coast and find the two barges bringing in the deadly cargo. They use some of Kennedy's goods to hold off the Regulares. Then the Regulares spot Escobar's rebels approaching and set up an ambush. Wilson fires at the barge carrying dynamite. The explosion devastates the hiding soldiers. The survivors flee. Wilson refuses Escobar's offer to join the rebellion and rides away to hopefully reunite with Lisa.

Cast

 Robert Mitchum as Wilson
 Ursula Thiess as Lisa Kennedy
 Gilbert Roland as Colonel Escobar
 Zachary Scott as Kennedy
 Rodolfo Acosta as Sebastian
 José Torvay as Gonzales
 Henry Brandon as Gunther
 Douglas Fowley as McGhee
 Victor Junco as General Lorenzo
 Alfonso Sánchez Tello	as General Brucero
 Arturo Manrique as Adolfo
 José Ángel Espinoza as Driver
 Margarito Luna as Santos
 Miguel Inclán as Priest
 José Muñoz as Man in Wagon
 Manuel Sánchez Navarro as Hotel Manager
 Antonio Sandoval as Indian Boy
 Alberto Pedret as Scout

Production
The film was based on an original screen story by Earl Felton called Horse Opera. It was about an American movie company in the early 1900s who is captured by Pancho Villa. The hero was a soldier of fortune, the right hand man to Pancho Villa, who falls for the movie company's leading lady, rescues her from Villa, takes her to Hollywood and becomes a movie star. A producer, Robert L Jacks liked it and set up the film at United Artists, with Robert Mitchum to star and Richard Fleischer to direct. Fleischer had worked with Felton several times but says the screenwriter wrote a script which diverted significantly from the original treatment, removing the movie company, the leading lady, Hollywood and Pancho Villa. Fleischer wanted to pull out of the project but United Artists were worried they would lose Mitchum and threatened to sue.

This film was shot on location in Mexico at Cuernavaca, Tepetlán, Palo Balero in Xochitepec, Yautepec de Zaragoza, Acapulco, Iguala and the Hotel Hacienda in Cocoyoc, Morelos.

Reception
Fleischer wrote that the film "turned out to be quite a good, commercially successful picture. It has, however, absolutely nothing to do with the picture I started out to make."

References

External links
 
 

1956 films
1956 Western (genre) films
American Western (genre) films
CinemaScope films
1950s English-language films
Films directed by Richard Fleischer
Films set in 1916
Films shot in Mexico
Mexican Revolution films
Films about arms trafficking
United Artists films
1950s American films